Coy Bowles is best known as a member of three-time Grammy Award-winning Zac Brown Band. He joined the Zac Brown Band in 2007, and plays guitar, slide guitar, dobro, piano and organ. He also contributes as a songwriter, and has writing credits on the albums You Get What You Give, Uncaged and Jekyll + Hyde, including three No. 1 hit songs – "Knee Deep", "Colder Weather" and "Sweet Annie".

Early life 
Bowles started playing guitar at age 11, and by the time he was 13, he had a band called Betty Doom that played punk rock and rock-n-roll music at local churches and birthday parties in his hometown, Thomaston, Georgia. Bowles went to college for biology at West Georgia College, where he met Zac Brown. Right before graduation, he shifted gears and decided that instead of biology, he wanted to pursue a career in music. He took a year off and practiced eight hours a day in order to get into Georgia State University's School of Music, where he was admitted to the Jazz Studies Program. Throughout college, Bowles played around the Atlanta area with various jazz and blues acts. Upon graduating, he started his own band, Coy Bowles and The Fellowship, and opened for Zac Brown Band at the Sky Bar in Auburn, Alabama. A week or two later, Bowles was asked to join the Zac Brown Band.

Children's books 
Outside of music, writing children's books is Bowles' way of giving back. The children's books he writes are about today's issues, with the hope of giving children, parents and teachers a common ground to face these issues and create a better tomorrow. 
 
In 2012, Bowles wrote and published his debut children's book "Amy Giggles, Laugh Out Loud". It is the story of self-confidence and reassurance, accepting who you are and the realization that our differences make each of us beautiful and unique. In 2016, he published Will Powers: Where There's a Will There's a Way, a story about overcoming self-entitlement and achieving your goals with dedication and a strong work ethic, followed by "When You're Feeling Sick" in 2017, which is full of encouraging, silly advice on how to face sick days with courage and a positive attitude.

Coy Bowles and The Fellowship 
Coy Bowles and The Fellowship is a band that fuses the roots of blues with the spontaneity of jazz and twinges of gospel, country and rock. According to Bowles, the idea behind The Fellowship is to have a group of musicians playing together under one common goal – to play your heart out and get down with the get down. When Bowles began writing music, he arranged the tunes in a way so that the listener could appreciate the songs for the melody and lyrics, but still have sections where the music was highly improvisational. He wanted the music he composed to possess a distinct and original sound, while still giving a nod to his musical heroes. In 2006, Coy Bowles and the Fellowship released their first album Into the Distance, the year before he joined Zac Brown Band. Coy Bowles and the Fellowship continue to play in the Atlanta area when he is not on the road with Zac Brown Band.

References

American country guitarists
American children's writers
Living people
Zac Brown Band members
Year of birth missing (living people)